Rodrigo García Barcha (born 24 August 1959) is a Colombian and Mexican television and film director, screenwriter, author and former cinematographer, best known for his films Nine Lives (2005), Mother and Child (2009), Albert Nobbs (2011), Last Days in the Desert (2015), as well as his work on the HBO drama series In Treatment. He also created, wrote, and directed the award-winning web series Blue (2012–2015), starring Julia Stiles, for which he won an IAWTV Award in 2014. In 2021 García released his first memoir, A Farewell to Gabo and Mercedes: A Son's Memoir of Gabriel García Márquez and Mercedes Barcha.

Life and career
García was born in Bogotá, Colombia, the son of Colombian Nobel-winner writer Gabriel García Márquez and Mercedes Barcha Pardo. Because of his father, he grew up around Carlos Fuentes, Julio Cortázar, Pablo Neruda and Luis Buñuel.

García has directed a variety of independent films, such as the award-winning Nine Lives (2005), which was nominated for the William Shatner Golden Groundhog Award for Best Underground Movie, and Albert Nobbs (2011), which screened at several film festivals, as well as episodes of several HBO series, including Six Feet Under, Carnivàle, and Big Love. He produced and developed the HBO drama series In Treatment.

He worked as a camera operator for Cold Heaven, Reality Bites, A Walk in the Clouds, The Birdcage, Twilight and Great Expectations, and as director of photography for Gia and Poison Ivy.

In 2012, García and Jon Avnet created WIGS, a web channel part of YouTube Original Channel Initiative that produces scripted drama mainly targeted to female audiences. For WIGS, García created, wrote and directed several web series, notably Blue, starring Julia Stiles, for which he won an IAWTV Award for Best Director – Drama in 2014.

Filmography

Feature films

TV series

TV films

Short films

Books

References

External links
 

1959 births
AFI Conservatory alumni
American film directors
American television directors
Colombian emigrants to the United States
Colombian film directors
Living people
People from Bogotá
Writers Guild of America Award winners